Edati is a Local Government Area in Niger State, Nigeria. Its headquarters are in the town of Enagi in the west of the area on the A124 highway at. The LGA consists of two areas,  separated by the Kaduna River. 
It has an area of 1,752 km and a population of 160,321 at the 2006 census.

The postal code of the area is 913.

References

Local Government Areas in Niger State